Electoral history of John Edwards, United States Senator from North Carolina (1999-2005), 2004 Democratic Vice Presidential nominee and candidate for Democratic Presidential nomination in 2004 and 2008

Democratic Primary for the United States Senate from North Carolina, 1998:
 John Edwards - 277,468 (51.38%)
 David G. Martin - 149,049 (27.60%)
 Ella Butler Scarborough - 55,486 (10.28%)
 Bob Ayers - 22,477 (4.16%)
 Mike Robinson - 20,178 (3.74%)
 James Everette Carmack - 8,200 (1.52%)
 Gene Gay - 7,173 (1.33%)

North Carolina United States Senate election, 1998:
 John Edwards (D) - 1,029,237 (51.15%)
 Lauch Faircloth (R) (inc.) - 945,943 (47.01%)
 Barbara Howe (LBT) - 36,963 (1.84%)

Minnesota Independence Party presidential caucus, 2004:
 John Edwards - 335 (41.10%)
 John Kerry - 149 (18.28%)
 George W. Bush (inc.) - 94 (11.53%)
 Ralph Nader - 78 (9.57%)
 None of the above - 66 (8.10%)
 Dennis Kucinich - 40 (4.91%)
 Lorna Salzman - 9 (1.10%)
 John McCain - 9 (1.10%)
 Al Sharpton - 5 (0.61%)
 David Cobb - 4 (0.49%)
 Wesley Clark - 4 (0.49%)
 Joe Lieberman - 4 (0.49%)
 Howard Dean - 3 (0.37%)
 Jesse Ventura - 3 (0.37%)
 Gary P. Nolan - 2 (0.25%)
 Timothy J. Penny - 2 (0.25%)
 Kent P. Mesplay - 1 (0.12%)
 John B. Anderson - 1 (0.12%)
 Charles W. Barkley - 1 (0.12%)
 Dean M. Barkley - 1 (0.12%)
 Bill Bradley - 1 (0.12%)
 Rudy Giuliani - 1 (0.12%)
 Mickey Mouse - 1 (0.12%)
 Theodore Roosevelt - 1 (0.12%)
   
2004 Democratic presidential primaries:
 John Kerry - 9,930,497 (60.98%)
 John Edwards - 3,162,337 (19.42%)
 Howard Dean - 903,460 (5.55%)
 Dennis Kucinich - 620,242 (3.81%)
 Wesley Clark - 547,369 (3.36%)
 Al Sharpton - 380,865 (2.34%)
 Joe Lieberman - 280,940 (1.73%)
 Uncommitted - 157,953 (0.97%)
 Lyndon LaRouche - 103,731 (0.64%)
 Carol Moseley Braun - 98,469 (0.61%)
 Dick Gephardt - 63,902 (0.39%)
 Scattering - 12,525 (0.08%)

2004 Democratic National Convention (Vice Presidential tally):
 John Edwards - chosen by acclamation

2004 United States presidential election:
 George W. Bush/Dick Cheney (R) (inc.) - 62,040,610 (50.73%) and 286 electoral votes (31 states carried)
 John Kerry/John Edwards (D) - 59,028,444 (48.27%) and 251 electoral votes (19 states and D.C. carried)
 John Edwards (D) - 1 electoral vote (Minnesota faithless elector)
 Ralph Nader/Peter Camejo (I) - 465,650 (0.38%)
 Michael Badnarik/Richard Campagna (Libertarian) - 397,265 (0.32%)
 Michael Peroutka/Chuck Baldwin (Constitution) - 143,630 (0.12%)
 David Cobb/Pat LaMarche (Green) - 119,859 (0.096%)

2008 New Hampshire Democratic Vice Presidential primary:

(* - write-in candidate)

 Raymond Stebbins - 50,485 (46.93%)
 William Bryk - 22,965 (21.35%)
 John Edwards* - 10,553 (9.81%)
 Barack Obama*  6,402 (5.95%)
 Bill Richardson* (write-in) - 5,525 (5.14%)
 Hillary Clinton* (write-in) - 3,419 (3.18%)
 Joe Biden* - 1,512 (1.41%)
 Al Gore* - 966 (0.90%)
 Dennis Kucinich* - 762 (0.71%)
 Bill Clinton* - 388 (0.36%)  
 John McCain* - 293 (0.27%)
 Christopher Dodd* - 224 (0.21%)
 Ron Paul* - 176 (0.16%)
 Jack Barnes, Jr.* - 95 (0.09%)
 Mike Gravel* - 91 (0.09%)
 Joe Lieberman* - 67 (0.06%)
 Mitt Romney* - 66 (0.06%)
 Mike Huckabee* - 63 (0.06%)
 Rudy Giuliani* - 46 (0.04%)
 Darrel Hunter* - 20 (0.02%) 

2008 Democratic presidential primaries and caucuses:

Results as of May 2008; information would change until end of the primaries seasonResults presented excluded penalized contests(* - dropped out from race)

 Barack Obama - 16,706,857
 Hillary Clinton - 16,239,821
 John Edwards* - 742,010
 Bill Richardson* - 89,054
 Uncommitted - 82,660
 Dennis Kucinich* - 68,482
 Joe Biden* - 64,041
 Mike Gravel* - 27,662
 Christopher Dodd* - 25,300
 Others - 22,556

References

Edwards, John Reid
John Edwards